Graham Letto is a Canadian politician, who served in the Newfoundland and Labrador House of Assembly from 2015 until 2019. He represented the district of Labrador West as a member of the Newfoundland and Labrador Liberal Party.

Prior to his election to the legislature, Letto served as mayor of Labrador City, Newfoundland and Labrador  from 2001 until 2009.

Background
He was born in Forteau and grew up in L'Anse-au-Clair.

Political career
In 1989, Letto sought election to the town council of Labrador City, and was elected. He was also re-elected to council in 1993 and 1997. Then in 2001, Letto was elected as mayor of Labrador City. During the 2003 Newfoundland and Labrador general election, he ran in the provincial riding of Labrador West as the Progressive Conservative candidate, but was defeated by Randy Collins of the NDP.

On May 24, 2005, Letto ran for the Conservative Party of Canada in the Labrador riding in a by-election. Letto lost, but increased the Conservative vote in the traditional Liberal riding substantially.

On September 27, 2005, Letto was re-elected mayor of Labrador City in the 2005 municipal election. He did not seek a third term during the 2009 municipal elections, and was succeeded by Janice Barnes.

Letto received a Federation of Canadian Municipalities Roll of Honour Award in June 2014.

In August 2015, Letto was nominated as the Liberal candidate in Labrador West for the 2015 provincial election. On November 30, 2015, Letto won the seat, defeating New Democrat and former Wabush Mayor Ron Barron and Progressive Conservative incumbent Nick McGrath.

On November 8, 2018, Letto was appointed Minister of Municipal Affairs and Environment.

In the 2019 provincial election Letto was defeated by NDP candidate Jordan Brown in a major upset.

Electoral record

Provincial

Federal

References

Conservative Party of Canada candidates for the Canadian House of Commons
Living people
Mayors of places in Newfoundland and Labrador
Members of the Executive Council of Newfoundland and Labrador
People from Labrador City
Liberal Party of Newfoundland and Labrador MHAs
21st-century Canadian politicians
Year of birth missing (living people)